Encore un dernier baiser is the first studio album by the French pop rock band Niagara. It came out in 1986 on Polydor.

By the time the album came out, the trio Niagara became a duo, as guitarist José Tamarin left before its release. (more precisely, after the release of the band's first single "Tchiki boum").

The album, which, in the words of the book 30 Years of French Rock, "hit the racks with its psychedelic silk sleeve", "turned into a jackpot win".

Like all four of the studio albums the band would release, Encore un dernier baiser was certified Gold in France.

Track listing

References 

Niagara (band) albums
1986 debut albums
Polydor Records albums